Marnhagues-et-Latour is a commune in the Aveyron department in southern France.

Geography
The Sorgues flows west-northwest through the commune; the Latour hamlet lies on its right bank. The Marnhagues hamlet lies in the valley of the Matas brook, a tributary of the Sorgues. The third hamlet in the commune, Laroquaubel, lies in the valley of the Annou, another tributary of the Sorgues.

Population

Sights
The Nonenque Charterhouse ( or Chartreuse de Nonenque) lies north of Laroquaubel, in the same valley.

See also
Communes of the Aveyron department

References

External links

Page about Marnhagues-et-Latour at the tourism office website
Website of the Nonenque Charterhouse

Communes of Aveyron
Aveyron communes articles needing translation from French Wikipedia